Malavita may refer to:

 Malavita (1951 film), an Italian film
 Malavita (2013 film), a French film which was released in the USA under the title The Family
 Malavita (Badfellas for 2010 English translation), a novel by French writer Tonino Benacquista

See also
 Mala vita